I Am a Singer is a Chinese version of the Korean reality show I Am a Singer and it is broadcast on Hunan Television. The show's first season premiered on January 18, 2013. The competitions was divided into five rounds (each round comprising two episodes), and the final phase having three episodes which was not included in the Korean version (Revival Round (which would later be called Breakout Round in the next season), Semifinals and Finals), giving the series a total of 13 episodes. Each round features seven singers performing in front of 500 public audiences to judge. The first episode of each round doesn't has any singer eliminated, but subsequent episodes will eliminate one singer, which was decided on which singers received a lower count of votes, while a new singer will substitute the eliminated singer in the following episode.

Chinese music duo Yu Quan, which consists of members Chen Yufan (陳羽凡) and Hu Haiquan (胡海泉),  were the inaugural winners of I Am a Singer on the finale aired live broadcast on April 12, 2013.

Production
I Am a Singer consist of 13 weeks of shows. The first 10 episodes were competition stage divided by five rounds of two episodes, each having a Qualifier and a Knockout round; followed by a Revival episode, Semi-finals and Grand finals. Each episode have a lineup of seven singers competing for the votes of the 500-member studio audience, with a role to decide the outcome at the end of the episode; each member will cast a vote of three singers of their preference, while the semi-finals round onwards changes to a single vote. These votes are accumulative over two episodes and the singer receiving the lowest votes after the Knockout round was eliminated, after which a new round begins with the vote count reset and a new singer will substitute in the place for the previously-eliminated singer.

Each singer was also assigned by the production to a manager or Music Partner, who would serve as an advisor for the singer; when the singer is voted out, the corresponding Music Partner will also be eliminated. Each show (except for the finals) do not have a fixed host, but the host was chosen from one of any eligible singers doubling as a role of the host; like Music Partners, singers will forfeit the hosting role upon their elimination.

Revival round
The season was originally announced to last 12 weeks without a Revival round; on Week 8, producer Hong Tao announced the Revival round will be added between the fifth Knockout and the semi-finals. Held after the final Knockout round on Week 11, the five previously eliminated singers (except Chyi Chin, due to his withdrawal) compete for the seventh and final place in the semi-finals. Each singer performed two songs, a rendition and an original, with votes cast in-between rounds. These votes are accumulative and the singer receiving a higher vote will be reinstated from the competition.

The season only featured eliminated singers while remaining singers (both initial and substitute singers) were exempt from the round; beginning on the next season, substitute singers were required to participate in the Revival round, due to time constraints and a lineup of many singers, singers sang only one song for the round.

Finals
The Grand finals were held live on April 12, 2013 over 4-hours starting at 7.30pm. Singers each compete for the title by performing two songs, a duet with a guest performer, and a solo. Votes cast after each round carries a percentage which would be converted into a score to determine the winning singer. The finals also invited previously eliminated and withdrawn singers to perform an additional, returning performance. This is the only season to date to do so; starting in the next season, though not mentioned or otherwise, only eliminated singers were invited to watch the performance.

Contestants
The following I Am a Singer season one contestants are listed in alphabetical order. Singers without a placement for the final are listed as finalists, and singers who withdrew are listed as withdrawn.

Key:
 – Winner
 – Runner-up
 – Other finalist
 – Withdrew

Future appearances
Yu Quan, Terry Lin, Aska Yang, Julia Peng and Shang Wenjie appeared as guest performers on the Biennial concert on the following season. Yu Quan also appeared on the same season as a guest performer in the premiere episode, while Huang Qishan returned on the finals as a guest assistant singer during round one. Huang and Yang appeared again on the Biennial concert on the third season. Zhou Xiao'ou returned as a guest assistant singer, while Yu Quan returned again (along with Han Lei and Han Hong) on a special Winners exhibition performance on the finals on the fourth season. 

Lin and Peng again returned as contestants, while Yang and Shang appear as guest assistant singers in the final episode, both on the fifth season.

Results 

{| class="wikitable" style="text-align:center; font-size:85%"
|+
|-
! rowspan="4" width="30" | !! rowspan="4" width="250" class="unsortable" |Singer !! colspan="15" |   Broadcast Date (2013)
|-
! width="30" |18 Jan
! width="30" |25 Jan
! width="30" |1 Feb
! width="30" |8 Feb
! width="30" |15 Feb 
! width="30" |22 Feb
! width="30" |1 Mar
! width="30" |8 Mar
! width="30" |15 Mar
! width="30" |22 Mar
! width="30" |29 Mar 
! width="30" |5 Apr 
! colspan="4" width="30" |12 Apr 
|-
! colspan="2" |1st Round
! colspan="2" |2nd Round
! colspan="2" |3rd Round
! colspan="2" |4th Round
! colspan="2" |5th Round
! rowspan="2" |Repechage
! rowspan="2" |Semifinal
! colspan="3" |Final Round
|-
! width="70" data-sort-type="text" |Qualifying!! width="70" data-sort-type="text" |Knockout !! width="70" data-sort-type="text|Qualifying!! width="70" data-sort-type="text" |Knockout   !! width="70" data-sort-type="text|Qualifying !! width="70" data-sort-type="text" |Knockout !! width="70" data-sort-type="text|Qualifying  !! width="70" data-sort-type="text" |Knockout  !! width="70" data-sort-type="text|Qualifying  !! width="70" data-sort-type="text" |Knockout !! width="70" data-sort-type="text|1st Round !! width="70" |2nd Round !! width="70" |Overall
|-
| 1
| Yu Quan 
| style="background: pink;"| 2 
| style="background: blue; color: white"| 1 
| style="background: pink;"| 4 
| style="background: blue; color: white"| 1
| style="background: pink;"| 2 
| style="background: pink;"| 6 
| style="background: pink;"| 4 
| style="background: pink;"| 4 
| style="background: pink;"| 2 
| style="background: pink;"| 2 
| style="background: pink;"| —
| style="background: pink;"| 3 
| style="background: blue; color: white"| 1
| style="background: pink;"| 2
| style="background: lime;"| 1  
|-
| 2
| Terry Lin
| — 
| — 
| — 
| —
| style="background: blue; color: white"| 1
| style="background: pink;"| 3
| style="background: pink;"| 2 
| style="background: blue; color: white"| 1
| style="background: blue; color: white"| 1 
| style="background: pink;"| 3 
| style="background: pink;"| —
| style="background: pink;"| 2 
| style="background: pink;"| 2
| style="background: blue; color: white"| 1
| style="background: yellow;"| 2 
|-
| =3
|  
| style="background: pink;"| 6 
| style="background: pink;"| 2 
| style="background: blue; color: white"| 1
| style="background: pink;"| 3 
| style="background: pink;"| 4
| style="background: blue; color: white"| 1
| style="background: blue; color: white"| 1
| style="background: pink;"| 3 
| style="background: pink;"| 4 
| style="background: pink;"| 6 
| style="background: pink;"| —
| style="background: pink;"| 6 
| style="background: pink;"| 3
| style="background: pink;"| —
| style="background: yellow;"| —
|-
| =3
| Aska Yang
| —
| —
| style="background: red; color: white"| 7
| style="background: grey; color: white"| 5
| style="background: grey; color: white"| —
| style="background: grey; color: white"| —
| style="background: grey; color: white"| —
| style="background: grey; color: white"| —
| style="background: grey; color: white"| —
| style="background: grey; color: white"| —
| style="background:#C697F3; "| 1 
| style="background: blue; color: white"| 1 
| style="background: pink;"| 3
| style="background: pink;"| —
| style="background: yellow;"| —
|-
| =3
| 
| —
| —
| —
| —
| —
| —
| —
| —
| style="background: pink;"| 3 
| style="background: pink;"| 4 
| style="background: pink;"|—
| style="background: pink;"| 4 
| style="background: pink;"| 5 
| style="background: pink;"|—
| style="background: yellow;"| —
|-
| =3
| Winnie Hsin 
| —
| —
| —
| —
| —
| —
| style="background: pink;"| 3 
| style="background: pink;"| 6 
| style="background: pink;"| 6 
| style="background: pink;"| 5 
| style="background: pink;"| —
| style="background: red; color: white"| 7 
| style="background: pink;"| 6 
| style="background: pink;"|—
| style="background: yellow;"| —
|-
| =3
| Zhou Xiao'ou
| —
| —
| —
| —
| style="background: pink;"| 3
| style="background: pink;"| 5
| style="background: red; color: white"| 7 
| style="background: pink;"| 2
| style="background: red; color: white"| 7 
| style="background: blue; color: white"| 1
| style="background: pink;"| —
| style="background: pink;"| 5 
| style="background: red; color: white"| 7 
| style="background: pink;"|—
| style="background: yellow;"| —
|-
| =8
| Sha Baoliang
| style="background: pink;"| 5 
| style="background: pink;"| 3 
| style="background: pink;"| 6
| style="background: pink;"| 2 
| style="background: red; color: white"| 7
| style="background: pink;"| 4 
| style="background: pink;"| 6
| style="background: pink;"| 5 
| style="background: pink;"| 5 
| style="background: grey; color: white"| 7
| style="background:#7FFFD4;"| —
| style="background: grey; color: white"| —
| style="background: grey; color: white"| —
| style="background: #F89B40;"| — 
| style="background: grey; color: white"| —
|-
| =8
| Shang Wenjie 
| style="background: pink;"| 4 
| style="background: pink;"| 4 
| style="background: pink;"| 3
| style="background: pink;"| 5
| style="background: pink;"| 6
| style="background: pink;"| 2 
| style="background: pink;"| 5
| style="background: grey; color: white"| 7
| style="background:#F89B40;"|— 
| style="background: grey; color: white"| —
| style="background:#7FFFD4;"| —
| style="background: grey; color: white"| —
| style="background:#F89B40;"| — 
| style="background: grey; color: white"| —
| style="background: grey; color: white"| —
|-
| =8
| Chen Ming
| style="background: red; color: white"| 7 
| style="background: pink;"| 6 
| style="background: pink;"| 5
| style="background: pink;"| 4 
| style="background: pink;"| 5
| style="background: grey; color: white"| 7
| style="background:#F89B40;"| —
| style="background: grey; color: white"| —
| style="background: grey; color: white"| —
| style="background: grey; color: white"| —
| style="background:#7FFFD4;"| —
| style="background: grey; color: white"| —
| style="background:#F89B40;"| — 
| style="background: grey; color: white"| —
| style="background: grey; color: white"| —
|-
| =8
| Paul Wong 
| style="background: pink;"| 3 
| style="background: grey; color: white"| 7
| style="background:#F89B40;"| — 
| style="background: grey; color: white"| —
| style="background: grey; color: white"| —
| style="background: grey; color: white"| —
| style="background: grey; color: white"| —
| style="background: grey; color: white"| —
| style="background: grey; color: white"| —
| style="background: grey; color: white"| —
| style="background:#7FFFD4;"| —
| style="background: grey; color: white"| —
| style="background:#F89B40;"| —
| style="background: grey; color: white"| —
| style="background: grey; color: white"| —
|-
| =8
| Chyi Chin 
| style="background: blue; color: white"| 1 
| style="background: pink;"| 5 
| style="background: pink;"| 2
| style="background: red; color: white"| 7 
| style="background: black; color: white"| —
| style="background: black; color: white"| —
| style="background: black; color: white"| —
| style="background: black; color: white"| —
| style="background: #F89B40;"| — 
| style="background: black; color: white"| —
| style="background: black; color: white"| —
| style="background: black; color: white"| —
| style="background: black; color: white"| —
| style="background: #F89B40;"| —
| style="background: black; color: white"| —
|-
|}

 Competition details 

 1st round 

 Qualifying 
Taping Date: January 10, 2013
Airdate: January 18, 2013

 Knockout 
Taping Date: January 17, 2013
Airdate: January 25, 2013

 Overall ranking 

 A. The total votes does not include 12 rejected votes.

 2nd round 

 Qualifying 
Taping Date: January 25, 2013
Airdate: February 1, 2013
The first substitute singer of the season was Aska Yang.

 Knockout 
Taping Date: January 31, 2013
Airdate: February 8, 2013
During this week, Chen was originally going to perform a medley of two songs with "悶" and "心痛的感覺", but later reversed after initially hesitated on her performance during rehearsal. Chin temporary withdrew from the competition earlier this week due to family reasons. The eliminations for the Knockout round went ahead as normal.

 Overall ranking 

 3rd round 

 Qualifying 
Taping Date: February 7, 2013
Airdate: February 15, 2013
Due to Chin's temporary withdrawal, one more singer for a total of two singers substituted the singers; they were Terry Lin and Zhou Xiao'ou.

 Knockout 
Taping Date: February 14, 2013
Airdate: February 22, 2013 
During this week, Sha volunteered to perform first as he was urgent on traveling to Beijing for the 2013 CCTV New Year's Gala, thus he was absent during the results; however, Sha was informed of the outcome via satellite telephone link from Beijing.

 Overall ranking 

 A. Has one vote difference between 3rd place singer
 B. Has one vote difference between 5th place singer
 *highest percentage of votes for any singer during the main competition of "Singer" for eight consecutive seasons

 4th round 

 Qualifying 
Taping Date: February 21, 2013
Airdate: March 1, 2013 
The fourth substitute singer of the season was Winnie Hsin. Chin, who announced his temporary withdrawal on week four, confirmed on this episode that he will permanently withdrawal from the competition due to mother's health. Lin initially performed "無字歌" but later changed it to "Opera" (instrumental) because his performance was identical to Huang's.

 Knockout 
Taping Date: February 28, 2013
Airdate: March 8, 2013
For this episode, the songs (dubbed as "Pot Luck") are determined by the audience online. Each singer chose three songs which he or she did not want to sing. If the audience picked one of these songs, the singer could choose another.

 Overall ranking 

 5th round 

 Qualifying (final qualfying round) 
Taping Date: March 7, 2013
Airdate: March 15, 2013
The fifth and last substitute singer of the season was Julia Peng. Hsin was initially going to perform "一样的月光" but later changed to "親愛的小孩" to pay respect to the victims of the baby murdering case in Changchun, occurred three days prior to the taping.

 Knockout (final knockout round) 
Taping Date: March 15, 2013
Airdate: March 22, 2013 
For this episode, singers had to sing at least one song that pays tribute to Chyi Chin (who withdrew from the competition after week 7).

 Overall ranking 

 Revival 
Taping Date: March 21, 2013
Airdate: March 29, 2013

In this Revival round, five of the six eliminated singers (with the exception of Chin) will participate in a chance to enter the semi-finals. Each singer sang two songs, and the singer having the most combined votes after the two songs was reinstated in the competition. For this week, the order of performances is decided by ballot, and the performance order were reversed during the second round.

 1st round 
After the first song, Yang was revealed to be temporarily leading the votes.

 2nd round 
After combining the overall votes from the two songs, Yang was revealed to be the singer who received the highest number of votes, thus reinstating him from the competition and advanced to the semifinals. The placements for the other four singers were not revealed.

 A. Voted 1st in the 40s and 50s age group
 B. Voted 1st in the Professional jury, the 10s and 20s age group.
 C. Voted 1st in the Singer vote and the 30s age group.

 Semifinals 
Taping Date: March 28, 2013
Airdate: April 5, 2013

The Semifinals carries a 40% weightage in the final round, and each audience member could now cast one vote each, down from the usual three.

 A. 3 vote difference with 6th place singer.
 B. 1 vote difference with 3rd place singer.

 Grand finals 

Airdate: April 12, 2013

The Grand Finals consist of two rounds, with the first song being a duet with a guest singer, and the second song being a solo encore performance. The weightages for both rounds were 30% and 30%, respectively; the contestant who received a higher combined total (both the semi-finals and grand finals) was crowned as the overall winner.

 Non-competition performances 

 First round: guest duets 
The order of performance of this round were based on their rankings from the semi-finals, starting with the singer who ranked first.

 Second round: winner's song 
The order of performance of this round were based on their rankings from the first song, starting with the singer who ranked last place; if tied, the singer with a higher ranking from the semifinals will perform first.

Winner of battle
Before the final results were announced, the host named Lin and Yu Quan as the "ultimate winner candidates". Yu Quan was declared the first-ever I Am a Singer'' winner with 25.78% of the combined total, beating Lin's combined total of 22.59%.

Ratings 

|-
|1
|
|
|
|1
|-
|2
|
|1.714
|8.08
|1
|-
|3
|
|2.014
|9.34
|1
|-
|4
|
|2.067
|8.24
|1
|-
|5
|
|1.963
|9.07
|1
|-
|6
|
|2.022
|8.83
|1
|-
|7
|
|2.381
|10.56
|1
|-
|8
|
|2.368
|11.35
|1
|-
|9
|
|2.336
|11.63
|1
|-
|10
|
|2.480
|12.20
|1
|-
|11
|
|2.206
|11.56
|1
|-
|12
|
|2.430
|11.94
|1
|-
|13
|
|
|
|1

Notes

References 

Singer (TV series)
Chinese music television series
2013 in Chinese music
2013 Chinese television seasons